GeaBios is a free (non-profit) "Slovene Citizen Oriented Information Service", and the name stands for Geo Enabled And Better Internet Oriented Services.

People backing up the service come from a variety of businesses, institutions and different countries, but mostly from Slovenia. All the information are somehow connected to the Earth and Space (geocoded). The Internet applications, which are running  mostly on client side, enable the viewing of maps, aerial photography and satellite imagery. They reveal the Earth from above and the Space from below. Many specific layers of different content can be pasted over those maps and images. Time dependent information is calculated on-line.

Motto: GeaBios is a process not a fixed solution.

Development
In 1999 the first application named Aviator 2000 2D/3D map over Internet came out. It was created in JavaScript (DHTML) with additional ActiveX/OpenGL plug-in. The application had little uptake, as Netscape Communicator, which did not support ActiveX, had a large market share at that time. Users complained because they were not able to use the 3D modules. To avoid that, developers created 2D Java 1.1 based interface and soon removed ActiveX application. For Internet Explorer users with Microsoft's JRE 1.1 the applications are still written in Java 1.1. Due to well known problems of Gecko's Java Live Connect the applications are being gradually transferred to Flash.

Contents
The basic principle in the design of the service is to "Keep it as simple as possible, but not more than that". Through offering a wide range of general interest data and useful services free of charge, the service is attractive for users in spite the fact that it is not always simple to use. GeaBios offers a variety of information and services, adding new ones constantly. Some of them are:

 Maps of Slovenia, Information about Slovenia (Slovenia in Brief), search for: addresses and other categories.
 On-line information about the Space, the Sky and the Earth, Solar System simulator
 Easy GPS navigation and Tracking Online
 Access to online weather forecasts including satellite and radar pictures
 Tide tables for Mediterranean
 Satellite imagery and maps with search for more than 8.000.000 geographic entities worldwide
 Atomic clock synchronization
 Tools such as a Unit Converter, English Dictionary OnLine, ...

Features

Information is provided in a wide range of displays, which include text, images, photographs, maps all of them inter related, and a lot of them time dependent. It is possible to locate information either from a graphical image (e.g. map) or from text. Applications are inter-connected and influence each other, for example, pre-defined flight over Julian Alps can drive a two-dimensional map (if available) to show the position and view angle. The same technique is used for GPS navigation. Most importantly, the applications act as components, they can work alone or together.

Data used

The information service contains data of two main types:
 Raster maps, starting from scale 1:5,000 to the scale 1:2,500,000. Software enables smooth zooming and panning through all scales.
 Geocoded data are represented by entities, which act as points, lines, polylines or areas. 2D and 3D. All information contained in the information service is geocoded. e.g. displayed on map.

Maps and geocoded data were obtained legally from the following companies and institutions:
 Ministry of Environment – Surveying and Mapping Authority of the Republic of Slovenia
 Geodetic Institute of Republic of Slovenia
 SAZU – Slovenian Academy of Sciences and Arts
 Geological Institute of Republic of Slovenia
 Statistical Office of the Republic of Slovenia
 Jet Propulsion Laboratory
 Academa Ltd

Technology used
The web page is created as RIA. The content is loaded in the background, JavaScript methods are changing the DOM of the main page, which acts like a layout manager with so called floating windows. Different applications run concurrently in the environment of the web page and communicate among each other. The applications are built as pure JavaScript, Java applets and flash applets.

Milestones

 May 1999, Aviator 2D/3D interactive maps (DHTML interface and ActiveX/OpenGL plug-in)
 August 2000, 2D maps Java based interface, search for Slovenian addresses, restaurants, ...
 May 2001, astronomy, Aviator 2D/3D was removed (reason: support of MS IE only – criticism of Netscape users)
 February 2002, Information kiosk system support
 May 2003, weather viewer modules added
 July 2004, new design, more applications are running simultaneously
 June 2005, satellite imagery, maps and search for geographic entities worldwide added
 September 2006, GeoRSS feed added
 June 2007, Experimental video geo-search

Funding
A private company Academa Ltd is funding the GeaBios project entirely from its own sources.

External links

Special pages

 Satellite Mapping Application – Tiny WMS/WFS Client
 Satellite imagery and maps. Search for more than 8,000,000 geographic entities worldwide. Different sources merged. Addons like: Google maps, Yahoo images search, geolocated web pages, [...] are driven from the application. It is based on Open Geospatial Consortium standards, and is created with Open Laszlo (open source development platform) and DHTML.
 Weather Viewer Application
 Weather models from different sources merged, time dependent animation, dynamic zoom, visual comparator, data gluing ability, ... The application is created as pure DHTML.

Websites using GeaBios
 Mindat.org – mineral location database
 Mineralienatlas.de – mineral and fossil location database
 Moodle – free, open source course management system for online learning (see Moodle)
 Ordinacija.net – the healthcare protection and service

 Wikipedia – external map source

Case studies
 Chris' GISmo's
 EasyWMS Open Source WebGIS Project

References

Geographic information systems
Web mapping
Web Map Services
Internet in Slovenia